Dallas Margarita Society dba Dallas Children's Charities (DMS/DCC) is a 501(c)(3) charitable corporation formed in 1977 when a group of Dallas businessmen decided to host a holiday party.

That signature event, the Annual Dallas Margarita Ball, has grown into the largest, invitation-only, charity black tie gala in the world with over 12,000 guests attending.

A literal mountain of joy accumulates at the event each year, as guests gladly respond to the organization's request to drop off a donated toy upon entry to the Ball or sponsor gifts with cash donations.

As the Annual Dallas Margarita Ball has expanded over four decades, so have the organization's goals. They've preserved the founders’ original intent – to provide gifts for “at risk” youth in the DFW area during the holiday season. However, the extent of gifting has broadened, as DMS/DCC now provides support to over 50 regional children's charities with gifts of cash, toys, computers, exercise gear, school supplies, and many others that are awarded, not just at Christmas, but in almost every month of the year. Over its history, DMS/DCC and its supporters have contributed millions of hours of community service and millions of dollars in gifts, including over 200,000 toys, to lift up those who need it most – disadvantaged kids.

Today, the combined value of what's given back exceeds a million dollars a year, but the smiles they provide are priceless.

20 November 2021 will mark  years of the Annual Dallas Margarita Ball, as 2020 went on hiatus. In addition to the toy collection efforts, this year's Dallas Margarita Ball will feature the Annual Silent Auction, completing  years. This Silent Auction has gained notoriety as one of the most extensive charity auctions in the United States and donors benefit from exposure to over 12,000 affluent guests, while supporting one of the organisation's most effective fundraising opportunities.

Culture of Dallas
Annual events in Texas
Balls in the United States